Donne is a crater on Mercury. It has a diameter of 86 kilometers. Its name was adopted by the International Astronomical Union (IAU) in 1976. Donne is named for the English poet John Donne, who lived from 1572 to 1631.

References

Impact craters on Mercury